Ernest Anthony Kehr (September 10, 1911 – November 13, 1986), of New York City, was a promoter and spokesman of stamp collecting, creating interest for the hobby using all media at the time, including radio, television, books, articles and newspapers columns devoted to philately; an American philatelist who was added to the Roll of Distinguished Philatelists in 1975.

Philatelic literature
Kehr had philatelic columns in numerous newspapers, including the New York World-Telegram, the New York Herald Tribune, and Long Island’s Newsday. On radio and television, he promoted philately in over two thousand shows. He wrote several books, with the most popular one being “The Romance of Stamp Collecting” published in 1947.

Philatelic activity
Kehr was active in the Collectors Club of New York and wrote numerous articles in their philatelic publications. He was the special representative for the United States for the Royal Philatelic Society London.

Honors and awards
Besides being named an Honorary Fellow of the Collectors Club of New York, Kehr received the Lichtenstein Medal in 1974, signed the Roll of Distinguished Philatelists in 1975, and was awarded the Luff Award in 1976 for Exceptional Contributions to Philately. He was named to the American Philatelic Society Hall of Fame in 1987.

Legacy
The Ernest A. Kehr award for excellence in the promotion of Youth Philately was established by the American Philatelic Society in 1991 in his honor.

See also
 Philately
 Philatelic literature

Notes

References
 Ernest Anthony Kehr
 Kehr Award

1911 births
1986 deaths
People from New York City
Signatories to the Roll of Distinguished Philatelists
Philatelic literature
American Philatelic Society
Fellows of the Royal Philatelic Society London
American philatelists
Officers Crosses of the Order of Merit of the Federal Republic of Germany